Prunum rostratum is a species of sea snail, a marine gastropod mollusk in the family Marginellidae, the margin snails.

Description

Distribution
P. rostratum can be found in Caribbean waters, ranging from Campeche to Panama.

References

 Rosenberg, G.; Moretzsohn, F.; García, E. F. (2009). Gastropoda (Mollusca) of the Gulf of Mexico, Pp. 579–699 in: Felder, D.L. and D.K. Camp (eds.), Gulf of Mexico–Origins, Waters, and Biota. Texas A&M Press, College Station, Texas
 Cossignani T. (2006). Marginellidae & Cystiscidae of the World. L'Informatore Piceno. 408pp

External links
 Redfield J.H. (1870). Catalogue of the known species, Recent and fossil, of the family Marginellidae. American Journal of Conchology. 6(2): 215-269
  Jousseaume F. (1875). Coquilles de la famille des marginelles. Monographie. Revue et Magazin de Zoologie. ser. 3, 3: 164-271; 429-435

Marginellidae
Gastropods described in 1870